Thermal blooming or thermal lensing occurs when high-energy laser beams propagate through a medium. It is the result of nonlinear interactions that occur when the medium (e.g. air or glass) is heated by absorbing a fraction of the radiation, causing a "thermal lens" to form, with a dioptric power related to the intensity of the laser, among other factors. The amount of energy absorbed is a function of the laser wavelength. The term "thermal blooming" is typically used when the medium is air, and can describe any type of self-induced "thermal distortion" of laser radiation. The term "thermal lensing" is typically used when describing thermal effects in the laser's gain medium itself.

See also
 Optical Kerr effect

References

 
 
 

Laser science
Nonlinear optics